Robert Mason Hauser is an American sociologist. He is the Vilas Research and Samuel F. Stouffer professor of sociology emeritus at the University of Wisconsin–Madison, where he served as director of the Institute for Research on Poverty and the Center for Demography of Health and Aging. 

Hauser is known for his work in quantitative sociology, studying issues such as social stratification, social mobility, impacts of education, race and gender, persistence of inequality across generations, and aging.
Hauser served as Executive Director of the Division of Behavioral and Social Sciences and Education at the National Academies of Sciences, Engineering, and Medicine (2010-2016) and now serves as executive officer of the American Philosophical Society (2017-).

Early life and education
Robert Mason Hauser was born to Sylvia and Julius Hauser in Chicago, Illinois. His father was an organic chemist with the Food and Drug Administration (FDA). His uncle, Philip M. Hauser, was a sociologist, demographer, and social statistician.  The family moved from Chicago to the Anacostia neighborhood of Washington, DC, in 1949 and to Silver Spring, Maryland in 1954.

Hauser has a  B.A. in economics (1963) from the University of Chicago and an M.A. (1966) and Ph.D. (1968) in sociology from the University of Michigan. His dissertation was Family, School, and Neighborhood Factors in Educational Performances in a Metropolitan School System, supervised by Otis Dudley Duncan. It was selected by the American Sociological Association  for publication in the Arnold and Caroline Rose Monograph series, appearing as Socioeconomic background and educational performance (1971).

Career
From 1967–1969 Hauser was on the faculty of the department of sociology and anthropology at Brown University. In 1969 Hauser joined the department of sociology at the University of Wisconsin–Madison.  Robert Hauser became the Vilas Research and Samuel F. Stouffer professor of sociology (now retired) at the University of Wisconsin–Madison, and served as director of the university's Institute for Research on Poverty and the Center for Demography of Health and Aging.

He worked with William H. Sewell and others to develop the Wisconsin model of status attainment, described as "paradigmatic in its influence on an entire subfield of the discipline."  Hauser joined the project in 1969 and led the Wisconsin Longitudinal Study (WLS) from 1980-2010, working closely with his wife, research scientist Taissa S. Hauser

Hauser has also served on several committees of the United States National Research Council. He was the Executive Director of the Division of Behavioral and Social Sciences and Education at the National Academies of Sciences, Engineering, and Medicine from 2010-2016.
He became executive officer of the American Philosophical Society as of June 12, 2017.

Research
Hauser has developed and used statistical methodology and data analysis techniques for the study of educational effects. 
Hauser's research examines trends in educational progression and social mobility in the US due to race, ethnicity and gender. He has studied the effects of families on social and economic inequality, and changes in socioeconomic standing, health, and well-being across the life course through the Wisconsin Longitudinal Study. He examines and critiques the use of educational assessment as a policy tool.

Awards and honors
 2008, Fellow, American Educational Research Association
 2005, Member, American Philosophical Society 
 2003, Award for Distinguished Contributions to the Teaching of Sociology, American Sociological Association
 1998, Fellow, National Academy of Education
 1986, Inaugural Paul F. Lazarsfeld award in research methods, American Sociological Association
 1984. Fellow, United States National Academy of Sciences
 1984, Elected, American Academy of Arts & Sciences
 1977, American Association for the Advancement of Science
 Fellow, Gerontological Society of America
 Member, American Statistical Association

Selected bibliography

References

External links
 Biographical sketch, Research proposal
 Curriculum Vitae

American demographers
American sociologists
Fellows of the American Statistical Association
Members of the United States National Academy of Sciences
University of Chicago alumni
University of Michigan alumni
University of Wisconsin–Madison faculty
Living people
Brown University faculty
Members of the American Philosophical Society
1942 births